Laß, Fürstin, laß noch einen Strahl (Let, Princess, let still one more glance) is a secular cantata composed as a funeral ode by Johann Sebastian Bach, first performed on 17 October 1727. In Wolfgang Schmieder's catalogue of Bach's works (BWV) it was assigned the number 198.

History and text 

Bach wrote several works for celebrations of the Leipzig University, Festmusiken zu Leipziger Universitätsfeiern.

He composed this cantata at the request of the university as a funeral ode for Christiane Eberhardine, wife of August II the Strong, the Elector of Saxony and King of Poland.  The cantata was first performed on 17 October 1727 in the University Church in Leipzig. Bach himself directed from the harpsichord. The text was written by Johann Christoph Gottsched, professor of philosophy and poetry.

The text is purely secular, proclaiming how the kingdom is in shock over the princess' death, how magnificent she was, and how sadly she will be missed. Sacred elements pertaining to salvation and the afterlife are absent. Bach, however, as was his custom, included a cryptic reference to salvation in the music. The first movement of the second section Der Ewigkeit saphirnes Haus ("Eternity's sapphiric house"), which was performed following the oration, contains underlying elements of the first movement of the cantata BWV 56, Ich will den Kreuzstab gerne tragen ("I want to bear the cross") which Bach had composed one year earlier. The measures 70–75 contain a direct quote (played by the oboe) of the bass solo voice in measures 91–98 from BWV 56 where the text is Der führet mich nach meinen Plagen zu Gott, in das gelobte Land ("which leads me to God in the promised land after all my tribulation").

In the introduction to the opening chorus, Bach expresses the reluctance to bid the final farewell to the Queen by prolonging the harmonies in a manner unusual even for him. After the opening chord he avoids resolving back to the finality of the tonic for ten bars, employing deceptive cadences, Neapolitan chord, and other furtive resolutions. This mirrors and enhances the intended longing of the opening text "Princess, let one more beam of light shine". The word "Strahl" ("beam [of light]") is sung in straight rising notes, while "Tränen" ("tears") is sung in falling, cascading notes, similar to "Tränen" in the closing chorus of the St Matthew Passion, BWV 244: Wir setzen uns mit Tränen nieder ("We sit down in tears"). The word "Fürstin" ("princess", also generic for "royal lady") is always sung isolated from the rest of the text, surrounded by rests.

Bach later borrowed from the cantata for his St Mark Passion and for Klagt, Kinder, klagt es aller Welt, BWV 244a, another funeral ode written in 1729.

Scoring and structure 
The cantata is scored for four vocal soloists (soprano, alto, tenor, bass), a four-part choir, two flutes, two oboes d'amore, two violins, viola, two violas da gamba, two lutes and basso continuo.

The ten movements are divided into two parts, to be performed before and after the funeral oration.
First part
Chorus: 
Recitative (soprano): 
Aria (soprano): 
Recitative (alto): 
Aria (alto): 
Recitative (tenor): 
Chorus: 
Second part
Aria (tenor): 
Recitative (bass): 
Chorus:

Selected recordings 

 J.S. Bach: Cantata BWV 198, Jürgen Jürgens, Monteverdi-Chor, Concerto Amsterdam, Telefunken, 1966
 J.S. Bach: Das Kantatenwerk – Sacred Cantatas Vol. 10, Knabenchor Hannover (Chorus Master: Heinz Hennig) & Collegium Vocale Gent (Chorus Master: Philippe Herreweghe), Leonhardt Consort, conductor Gustav Leonhardt, Teldec 1989
 Bach Edition Vol. 14 – Cantatas Vol. 7, Pieter Jan Leusink, Holland Boys Choir, Netherlands Bach Collegium, Brilliant Classics 2000
 J.S. Bach: Complete Cantatas Vol. 4, Amsterdam Baroque Orchestra & Choir, conductor Ton Koopman, Antoine Marchand

References

External links 

 Laß, Fürstin, laß noch einen Strahl, BWV 198: performance by the Netherlands Bach Society (video and background information)
 
 Lass, Fürstin, lass noch einen Strahl (cantata, ode) BWV 198; BC G 34 / Secular cantata Leipzig University
 Details and links from bach-cantatas.com
 English translation of the text

Secular cantatas by Johann Sebastian Bach
Funerary and memorial compositions
1727 compositions